André Riou (known as L'homme au béret) (8 August 1918– 5 October 2005) was a French footballer.

Riou was born in Toulouse, and played for Toulouse FC at the end of the 1930s as a striker, but was best known as a manager all over France.

He was also head of youth development for the FFF, at the beginning of the 1950s, and was also regional head of technical coaching until the 1980s.

Playing career 
 Racing de Paris
 Toulouse FC

Playing honours 
 Champion of Zone Sud in 1943 (TFC)

Coaching career 
 Toulouse FC
 AS Biterroise (D2)
 Red Star Olympique Audonien/Stade Français: 1948 to 1950
 Amiens SC
 Standard de Liège: 1953 (1st pro. coach at the club) in 1958
 Daring Club Bruxelles: 1958 to 1961
 RAEC Mons: 1962 to 1965
 Union Saint-Gilloise: 1965 to 1966

Honours as coach 
 Champions of Belgium : 1958 (with Standard, 1st national professional title for the club)
 Coupe de Belgique : 1954 (with Standard, 1st cup for the club, as pros.)

References

French footballers
Racing Club de France Football players
French football managers
Standard Liège managers
Red Star F.C. managers
Royale Union Saint-Gilloise managers
1918 births
2005 deaths
Footballers from Toulouse
Amiens SC managers
AS Béziers Hérault (football) managers
Association football forwards